Plateia or Platia (πλατεία) is the Greek word for town square. Most Greek and Cypriot cities have several town squares which are a point of reference in travelling and guiding. In traditional societies like villages and provincial communities, plateies are the central places for feasts, celebrations, events and meetings.

The original ancient Greek word (plural plateiai) meant one of the (usually 3) main east-west streets in an ancient Greek city such as Naples. They were crossed by stenopoi, north-south streets in a rectangular town plan.

Notable squares (plateies) in Greece

Athens:
Amerikis Square - Patissia
Eleftherias Square
Exarcheion Square - Exarcheia
Iroon Square - Psyri
Karaiskaki Square - Metaxourgeio
Klauthmonos Square
Koliatsou Square
Kolonaki Square - Kolonaki
Kotzia Square (by the city hall of Athens)
Koumoundourou Square
Kypselis Square - Kypseli, Athens
Lysikratous Square - Plaka
Mavili Square
Mitropoleos Square (by the Metropolitan Cathedral of Athens)
Monastiraki Square
Omonoia Square (Plateia Omonoias, Concord Square)
Pagratiou Square - Pagrati
Syntagma Square (Constitution Square, Greek: Plateia Syntagmatos)
Viktoria Square
Suburban Athens:
Agia Paraskevi Square - Agia Paraskevi
Iroon Square - Ano Liosia
Agia Triada Square - Argyroupoli
Chalandriou Square - Chalandri
Dourou Square - Chalandri
Karaiskaki Square - Ilioupoli
Davaki Square Plateia Davaki - Kallithea, SW of Athens
Plateia Othonos - Neo Irakleio
Aristotelous Square, Athens - Thrakomakedones
Iroon Square (Plateia Iroon) - Vrilissia
Pavlou Mela Square Plateia Pavlou Mela - Axioupoli
Central Square Kentriki Plateia - Didymoteicho
Egon Square - Edessa
Eleftherias Square - Feres
Central Square Kentriki Plateia - Filiatra
Central Square Kentriki Plateia - Fyli
Agia Triada Square - Glyka Nera
Marathonas Square - Grammatiko
Bakogiannis Square - Heraklia
Daskalogiannis Square Plateia Daskalogianni (named after Daskalogiannis) - Heraklio
Elefterias Square - Plateia Elefterias - Katerini
Agoras Square (meaning Market Square) Plateia Agoras - Kilkis
Vizyinou Square - Komotini
Nikis Square - Plateia Nikis - Kozani
Lassani Square - Plateia Lassani - Kozani
Laou Square - Lamia
Agiou Dimitriou Square - Lechaina
Christos Elkomenos Square - Monemvasia
Sapphous Square - Mytilene
Plateia Syntagmatos and Trion Navarchon Square - Nafplio
Patras:
Agia Sofia Square (in the Agia Sofia neighbourhood)
Georgiou I Square (Dimokratias)
Marouda Square - a square featuring the statue of Konstantinos Giannias
Olga Square Plateia Olgas(Ethnikis Antistasis)
Pyrosvesteio Square (in the Pyrosvesteio neighborhood)
A square in the Agios Andreas neighborhood by Trion Navarcheion Street
A square in the Agios Dionyssios neighborhood
A square by Agiou Nikolaou Street near the Port of Patras
A square at the east end of Dimitri Gounari Street near the Drosia neighbourhood
A square in the Tsivdi neighborhood
A square on Akrotiriou Street by Damaskou
A square by Akrotiriou Street near Evvoias Street
A square on Georgiou Olympou Street
Two squares on Lontou Street
Ypsila Alonia Square Plateia Ypsila Alonia - all in Patras
Korai Square Plateia Korai - Piraeus
Eleftherias Square - Rhodes
Eleftherias Square - Servia
Agias Mimas Square - Spetses
Aristotelous Square - Thessaloniki
Eleftherias Square - Thessaloniki
Kennedy Square, and two others - Tripoli
Riga Fereou Square - Volos
Kampana Square - Kefalonia

In Cyprus

Eleftheria Square - Nicosia 
Faneromeni Square - Nicosia
Solomos Square - Nicosia
Eleftheria Square - Larnaca 
Troodos Square - Troodos mountains; used as a point of reference for meteorological, (time) distance and altitude purposes.

See also
 Agora
 List of city squares
 List of fountains in Greece
 Market square
 Town square
 Roman Forum
 Forum (Roman)

Gallery

References

Town squares